NPA Satellite Mapping is the longest-established satellite mapping specialist in Europe, with expertise in geoscience applications of earth observation and remote sensing. In addition to processing and distributing data from a variety of optical and radar satellites, NPA specialises in added-value and derived products, providing validation and interpretation of satellite-based imagery.

Company
The company was founded in 1972 as Nigel Press Associates. In April 2008 the company was acquired by Fugro, a Dutch group who provide geotechnical, survey and geoscience services to the oil, gas, mining and construction industries.  In 2013 Fugro divested it's Geoscience Division, which included NPA, to CGG. The company remains based in Edenbridge, UK.

Imagery and Elevation Data

NPA distributes optical and radar imagery at a range of resolutions, maintaining one of the largest private satellite image archives, and provide advice and acquisition services for more specific customer applications. As a member of the SARCOM consortium, NPA also distribute radar data from the ESA satellites. The company also supply satellite and airborne derived terrain and elevation products, including Digital Elevation Models (DEMs), building height maps, 3D views and fly-throughs.

Oil and Mineral Exploration
NPA specialises in a range of techniques for both onshore and offshore exploration. Onshore, their expertise in structural geological interpretation and mineral mapping is increasingly complemented by newer applications such as seismic planning, subsidence mapping and reservoir modelling. Offshore, NPA's Global Offshore Seep Project uses SAR data to detect oil seepage from potential reservoirs.

Ground Stability
Interferometric Synthetic Aperture Radar (InSAR) can generate maps of surface deformation or elevation, using satellite radar data. Depending on the situation, InSAR can detect and monitor centimetre to millimetre scale deformation over wide areas, right down to monitoring of local areas and structures.  Applications include monitoring of urban structures, infrastructure, tunnelling, subsidence, landslides, resource extraction and geological phenomena.

In addition to a wide variety of commercial projects, they have a significant involvement with national and European bodies such as British National Space Centre, British Geological Survey and the European Space Agency (ESA). Major projects include Terrafirma, which provides a ground motion hazard information service distributed throughout Europe via national geological surveys and institutions, and the Pipemon project which studied remote sensing technology for routing and monitoring of pipelines. Their PSI study of London in collaboration with the Environment Agency received national press coverage, showing ongoing subsidence in east London.

See also
Remote Sensing
Geographic information system (GIS)
Geomatics
Geophysical survey
Interferometric Synthetic Aperture Radar
Imagery Analysis
Imaging Science
Land cover
List of Earth observation satellites
Synthetic Aperture Radar

References

Map companies of the United Kingdom
Companies based in Kent
British companies established in 1972